William Robert Lawrence (28 July 1906 – 13 January 2004) was an Australian politician. Born in Horsham, Victoria, he attended state schools and then the University of Melbourne before returning to Horsham as a dentist; he also sat on Horsham City Council. In 1949, he was elected to the Australian House of Representatives as the Liberal member for Wimmera. He held the seat until 1958, when he was defeated by the Country Party candidate. Lawrence died in 2004.

References

Liberal Party of Australia members of the Parliament of Australia
Members of the Australian House of Representatives for Wimmera
Members of the Australian House of Representatives
1906 births
2004 deaths
20th-century Australian politicians